Merkushevo is the name of several rural localities in Russia:
Merkushevo, Dobryansky District, Perm Krai, a village in Dobryansky District, Perm Krai
Merkushevo, Permsky District, Perm Krai, a village in Permsky District, Perm Krai